Telemark University College (TUC, HiT) was, until its merger, the fourth largest university college in Norway. The University College had about 7000 students, split between four different locations in Bø, Notodden, Porsgrunn, Rauland and Drammen.

Hierarchy 
The university college was organised into four faculties: The Faculty of Arts and Sciences, The Faculty of Arts, Folk Culture and Teacher Education, The Faculty of Health and Social Studies and The Faculty of Technology.

More than 140 courses of study were offered within the fields of Engineering, Nursing, Teaching, Culture, Folk Culture, Folk Music, Environmental and health studies, Sports and physical education, Outdoor life, Economics, Computer Science and Languages.

Studies were offered at bachelor's and master's degree-level, in addition to professional writer's education.  They furthermore offered two PhD programmes. There were also several one–year programmes available. Most studies were taught in Norwegian, but some programmes were taught in English, mainly master's degrees. Telemark University College used the European Credit Transfer and Accumulation System

The last rector was Kristian Bogen. In 2016 it merged with Buskerud and Vestfold University College to form the University College of Southeast Norway.

References

External links 
 

University of South-Eastern Norway
Florence Network
Telemark
Notodden
Buildings and structures in Porsgrunn
Educational institutions with year of establishment missing
Bø, Telemark
Vinje
Porsgrunn
Educational institutions disestablished in 2016
2016 disestablishments in Norway